Sari Kand may refer to:
 Sari Kand-e Dadash Beyk
 Sari Kand-e Kabali
 Sari Kand-e Olya